Glenduan is a small township lying to the north of Nelson, New Zealand. It lies on the shore of Tasman Bay / Te Tai-o-Aorere between the northern end of Boulder Bank and Pepin Island.

The settlement's main park, Glenduan Reserve, is a public beach and local park.

Horoirangi Marine Reserve is located offshore of Glenduan.

Demographics
The population was 477 in the 2013 census. This was an increase of 27 people since the 2006 Census.

Glenduan is part of the Nelson Rural statistical area.

References

Populated places in the Nelson Region
Populated places around Tasman Bay / Te Tai-o-Aorere